The 1959 Cleveland Indians season was the 59th in franchise history. The Indians finished in second place in the American League with a record of 89 wins and 65 losses, five games behind the AL Champion Chicago White Sox.

Offseason 
 October 27, 1958: Jay Porter was traded by the Indians to the Washington Senators for Ossie Álvarez.
 November 20, 1958: Don Mossi, Ray Narleski, and Ossie Álvarez were traded by the Indians to the Detroit Tigers for Billy Martin and Al Cicotte.
 December 2, 1958: Vic Wertz and Gary Geiger were traded by the Indians to the Boston Red Sox for Jimmy Piersall.
January 23, 1959: Earl Averill, Jr. and Morrie Martin were traded by the Indians to the Chicago Cubs for Jim Bolger and John Briggs.

Regular season 
On June 10, right fielder Rocky Colavito hit four home runs in one game against the Baltimore Orioles.

Season standings

Record vs. opponents

Notable transactions 
 April 11, 1959: Mickey Vernon was traded by the Indians to the Milwaukee Braves for Humberto Robinson.
 May 4, 1959: Randy Jackson was traded by the Indians to the Chicago Cubs for Bob Smith.
 June 6, 1959: Jim Bolger and cash were traded by the Indians to the Philadelphia Phillies for Willie Jones.
 September 9, 1959: Chuck Tanner was purchased by the Indians from the Boston Red Sox.

Opening Day Lineup

Roster

Player stats

Batting

Starters by position 
Note: Pos = Position; G = Games played; AB = At bats; H = Hits; Avg. = Batting average; HR = Home runs; RBI = Runs batted in

Other batters 
Note: G = Games played; AB = At bats; H = Hits; Avg. = Batting average; HR = Home runs; RBI = Runs batted in

Pitching

Starting pitchers 
Note: G = Games pitched; IP = Innings pitched; W = Wins; L = Losses; ERA = Earned run average; SO = Strikeouts

Other pitchers 
Note: G = Games pitched; IP = Innings pitched; W = Wins; L = Losses; ERA = Earned run average; SO = Strikeouts

Relief pitchers 
Note: G = Games pitched; W = Wins; L = Losses; SV = Saves; ERA = Earned run average; SO = Strikeouts

Awards and honors 
First All-Star Game: Rocky Colavito, Vic Power
Second All-Star Game: Rocky Colavito, Vic Power

League leaders 
Rocky Colavito, American League leader in home runs (tied)

Farm system 

LEAGUE  CHAMPIONS: Mobile, Selma

References

External links 
1959 Cleveland Indians team page at Baseball Reference
1959 Cleveland Indians team page at www.baseball-almanac.com
1959 WS page at Baseball Reference

Cleveland Indians seasons
Cleveland Indians season
Cleveland Indians